Zahana is a town and commune in Mascara Province, Algeria. According to the 1998 census it has a population of 18,839.

Notable people
 Ahmed Zabana

References

Communes of Mascara Province